Raymond Henry "Ray" Bell (31 December 1925 – 19 July 2016) was a New Zealand rugby union player. A wing and fullback, Bell represented Otago at a provincial level, and was a member of the New Zealand national side, the All Blacks, from 1951 to 1952. He played nine matches for the All Blacks including three internationals. He later served as an Otago selector from 1968 to 1971.

Bell served with J Force, the New Zealand occupying force in Japan, from 1946 to 1948. He died in Dunedin on 19 July 2016.

References

1925 births
2016 deaths
Rugby union players from Dunedin
People educated at King's High School, Dunedin
New Zealand rugby union players
New Zealand international rugby union players
Otago rugby union players
Rugby union fullbacks
Rugby union wings
New Zealand referees and umpires
New Zealand military personnel